Alfonso Dampf Tenson (3 December 1884 Hiiumaa – 17 March 1948 Mexico City) was an entomologist. As an entomological authority he is cited as Dampf.

Biography

Early years
Dampf was born on the Estonian island of Hiiumaa, the son of Michael Dampf and Maria Tenson. He obtained his doctorate degree from the University of Königsberg in 1909.

Career
During his studies Dampf began working as an assistant in the Zoological Museum and Institute of the University of Königsberg until 1912. In 1913 he was appointed as the Government Entomologist of German East Africa, a position he held until 1919. In 1920 he returned work as an assistant in the Zoological Museum and Institute of the University of Königsberg before leaving for Mexico in 1923. Dampf held multiple positions in Mexico and became a Mexican citizen in 1941.

Legacy
Dampf worked on multiple groups including Tipulidae, Siphonaptera and Simulidae. It is estimated he collected over a million insect specimens during his career.

Species described
 Ceratophyllus rossittensis

References

External links
Additional biographic information, described species and honorific taxa (no citations)

1884 births
1948 deaths
People from Hiiumaa Parish
People from Kreis Wiek
Estonian entomologists
Mexican entomologists
20th-century German zoologists
University of Königsberg alumni